Švedlár is a village and municipality in the Gelnica District in the Košice Region of eastern Slovakia. Total municipality population was, in 2011, 2083 inhabitants. The town predominantly consisted of Carpathian Germans until 1945, when they were expelled.

References

External links
Švedlár - Okres Gelnica - E-OBCE.sk
Official homepage

Villages and municipalities in Gelnica District
Romani communities in Slovakia